Shakespeare attribution studies is the scholarly attempt to determine the authorial boundaries of the William Shakespeare canon, the extent of his possible collaborative works, and the identity of his collaborators. The studies, which began in the late 17th century, are based on the axiom that every writer has a unique, measurable style that can be discriminated from that of other writers using techniques of textual criticism originally developed for biblical and classical studies. The studies include the assessment of different types of evidence, generally classified as internal, external, and stylistic, of which all are further categorised as traditional and non-traditional.

The Shakespeare canon

The Shakespeare canon is generally defined by the 36 plays published in the First Folio (1623), some of which are thought to be collaborations or to have been edited by others, and two co-authored plays, Pericles, Prince of Tyre (1609) and The Two Noble Kinsmen (1634); two classical narrative poems, Venus and Adonis (1593) and The Rape of Lucrece (1594); a collection of 154 sonnets and "A Lover's Complaint", both published 1609 in the same volume; two passages from the manuscript play Sir Thomas More, and a few other works. In recent years, the anonymous history play The Reign of King Edward III (1596) has been added to the canon, with Brian Vickers proposing that 40% of the play was written by Shakespeare, and the remainder by Thomas Kyd (1558–1594).

The Booke of Sir Thomas More

Sir Thomas More is an Elizabethan play that depicts scenes from the life of Thomas More. It is believed that it was originally written by playwrights Anthony Munday and Henry Chettle, then perhaps several years later heavily revised by another team of playwrights, including Thomas Heywood, Thomas Dekker, and possibly Shakespeare, who is generally credited with two passages in the play. It survives only in a single manuscript, now owned by the British Library.

The suggestion that Shakespeare had a hand in certain scenes was first made in 1871–72 by Richard Simpson and James Spedding, based on stylistic impressions. In 1916, the paleographer Sir Edward Maunde Thompson judged the addition in "Hand D" to be in Shakespeare's handwriting. However, there is no explicit external evidence for Shakespeare's hand in the play, so the identification continues to be debated.

A Funeral Elegy

In 1989, Donald Foster attributed A Funeral Elegy for Master William Peter to William Shakespeare on the basis of a stylometric computer analysis of its grammatical patterns and idiosyncratic word usage. The attribution received much attention and was accepted into the canon by several highly respected Shakespeare editors. However, analyses published in 2002 by Gilles Monsarrat and Brian Vickers showed that the elegy more likely was one of John Ford's non-dramatic works, not Shakespeare's, a view to which Foster conceded.

See also
 Chronology of Shakespeare's plays
 Early texts of Shakespeare's works
 Higher criticism
 Philology
 Shakespeare Apocrypha
 Shakespeare's editors
 Textual criticism
 Stylometry

Footnotes

References

External links
 "An Application of Authorship Attribution by Intertextual Distance in English" by Thomas Merriam
 The Claremont Shakespeare Clinic
 London Forum for Authorship Studies  at the University of London

Shakespearean scholarship
Works by William Shakespeare